The Nebuly Coat is a suspense novel written by J. Meade Falkner. It was published in 1903 and has since been adapted for the stage.

Plot
The book tells of the experiences of a young architect, Edward Westray, who is sent to the remote town of Cullerne to supervise restoration work on Cullerne Minster. He finds himself caught up in Cullerne life, and hears rumours about a mystery surrounding the claim to the title of Lord Blandamer, whose coat of arms in the Minster's great transept window is the nebuly coat of the title. When the new Lord Blandamer arrives, promising to pay all the costs of the restoration, Westray suspects that the new lord is not what he seems.

The Telegraph said the book "could strike the careless reader as no more than a curiosity, a bit of amateur work. Yet this would be a mistake."

Background

The Nebuly Coat includes elements that were central interests in Falkner's life, church architecture and heraldry. The massive Romanesque arches of Cullerne Minster recall those of Durham Cathedral which Falkner was familiar with through his work as Honorary Librarian to the Dean and Chapter as well as viewing it from his house on Palace Green.

Publication history
 1903 1st edition, Edward Arnold, London
 1904 5th impression, Edward Arnold, London
 1943 Penguin Books No 437
 1954 Geoffrey Cumberlege / Oxford University Press (together with The Lost Stradivarius)
 1983 Three Rivers Bks,  and  
 1988 Oxford University Press
 1989 Oxford Paperbacks,  
 2004 Ash-Tree Press, Ashcroft, British Columbia, 
 2006 Steve Savage Publishers Limited 
 2009 Athelstane Kindle Edition ASIN B0015YEQ1Y

Productions
It was adapted for radio in the Story Time slot on the BBC Home Service by Thea Holme starting on 1 April 1965. It was produced by Brian Miller, and the organ was played by Edward Fry at St. Monica's Chapel, Bristol. The actors were:
Canon Parkyn: Eric Anderson
Westray: Peter Marinker
Dr Ennefer: Ronald Russell
Sharnall: Peter Pratt
Janaway: Robert Bashford
Creole singer: Mollie Petrie
Anastasia: Carol Marsh
Miss Joliffe: Gladys Spencer

References

 Review. The Spectator. 14 November 1903. pp. 813–14.

External links

  

1903 British novels
Church buildings in fiction
English novels
Novels about architects